The Voznesenka mine is a large mine located in the south-eastern Russia in Primorsky Krai. Voznesenka represents one of the largest fluorite reserves in Russia having estimated reserves of 450 million tonnes of ore grading 35% fluorite.

References 

Fluorite mines in Russia